George Robb (24 September 1858 – 15 April 1927) was a Scotland international rugby union player.

Rugby Union career

Amateur career

Robb played rugby union for Glasgow University.

He moved in season 1881–82 to play for Glasgow Academicals.

Provincial career

He was capped by Glasgow District in the inter-city match against Edinburgh District in 1880. He also played the following year in December 1881.

He was also capped by West of Scotland District in 1881.

International career

Robb was capped twice by Scotland from 1881 to 1885.

References

1858 births
1927 deaths
Scottish rugby union players
Scotland international rugby union players
Glasgow University RFC players
Glasgow District (rugby union) players
West of Scotland District (rugby union) players
Glasgow Academicals rugby union players
Rugby union players from Glasgow
Rugby union forwards